Tejaban is a small village in Balochistan province of Pakistan. It is 70km from Turbat, near a river  known as the Kech River. Agricultural activities in Tejaban are possible due to water from the Kech. But the river results in many problems as well. Lack of safe ways to control the water results dangerous consequences in heavy rain seasons as water enters into agricultural lands and destroys the crops. The word Tejaban means "a lot of water".

Tejaban is surrounded by mountains and rivers and it is between the two villages of Hironk and Hoshab.

Agricultural activities 

Agriculture is the backbone of Tejaban; maximum earning is directly or indirectly connected with agriculture. Water for agriculture is allocated through the Karez System. Some of the agricultural lands are owner-cultivated while others are given to 2nd parties on shared basis. The share of owner is 2/3 while the share of cultivator remains 1/3.

Various crops are cultivated 

Various crops are cultivated in Tejaban. The list of crops being cultivated is long but some popular crops are rice, date, bakla, wheat, and onion. All these crops are produced in bulk quantities but the specialty of Tejaban are dates. The cultivation of wheat is totally dependent on rains as it is cultivated in bands (Bands are agricultural lands which are not connected to Karez system and watering of these lands is done directly from river). In the absence of rains, the level of the water becomes very low and sometimes is zero. So much of the time the farmers are unable to cultivate wheat.

Processing of dates 

Date season (from May to August) is very much enjoyed, especially by the children as it is their vocations. People from many areas come to Tejaban for Aamin (the process of collecting dates is called Aamin). They live in temporary camps and return to their homelands as soon as date season comes to an end. People of Tejaban are very hospitable. They welcome people coming from various areas for Aamin (date season).

Many kinds of dates are produced including Begam-jangi, Haleeni, Mozzati, Rogheni, Peeshna, Shakari, Gog-na, Aap e dandan, Kongo, and Chapshok. The best date is Begam-Jangi as it is very tasty and can be store for a long period. These dates are sold in big markets. Main markets are Karachi and Quetta. These dates could be made better, if facilities are provided to the farmers. A date processing unit is much needed in these areas.

Karez System 

In Tejaban agricultural water is  accomplished through the Karez System. Karez is a local system in which a large number of wells are interconnected to collect and share water. Water flows in the form of channels, which is then used for farming. The best thing about this system is that it saves energy. No fuel is used for collecting water, unlike tube-wells.

The main Karez (Kahn) are Peerin Kahn, Gul Mohd e Kahn, Chammagan, Jumma kahn, Peer Mohd Kahn, Sabzal e Kahn and Meer e Khan. The oldest one is Peerin kahn as its name suggests. (Peerin means the oldest.)  At one time the water was divided among the former  on the basis of Taas (a type of bowl having a hole in the bottom). Taas was put into water and the time for one  getting water changed as the Taas filled up. But now watches replaced that system.

People of Tejaban 
Both men and women participate in community maintenance projects and in work to earn money.

Culture 

100% of the population speaks the Balochi language and their religion is Islam. Most of the people and especially the older ones have CHADER on their shoulders and PAG on their heads. These are the symbol of Balochi culture of the Baloch people. The younger ones wear long SHALWAR and small KAMEEZ to show their love for culture. Some even have CHADER on shoulders as well. The women also follow the culture. They wear full Balochi dresses. These dresses are mostly full of embroidery.

Education and health 

Now Education and Health, there are only three primary schools (two for boys and one for girls) and one middle school (but it is not properly staffed). There is also a hospital . A rest house was provided to Tejaban but with no facilities.

Hunting 

People of Tejaban love to Hunt. Some of Huntting Points are Tejaban a mulk, Seheen Kahoor, Kalgalo, Rongan e Aap, Gwapi e Aap, Sore Aap and Karki Jangle. The best hunting period is August to October. It is the period when Rice, date and Wheat crops become ready. The birds are hunted when they come to eat these crops. Tejaban a mulk, Seheen Kahor and Kalgalo are the points where birds come to eat crops. Other points are the one where the birds come to quench their thrust. Rongan a aap, Gwapi a aap and Sor a aap are the points where birds come to drink water.

Sub-areas of Tejaban 

Main areas of Tejaban are Syed-Aabad, Meer Karim Bakhash Bazar, Faqeer Mohammad Bazar, Sing-Aabad and Karki. Some of small areas are Majboor Bazar, Gwarkopi Bazar, Dil Ganok and Aaptari. Tejaban is surrounded by a long range of mountains. The highest mountain ranges are Janzat and Mok e sar.

References

External links 
 http://www.tejaban.webs.com

Populated places in Kech District